General Washington Inn is a historic inn and tavern located at Downingtown, Chester County, Pennsylvania.  It was built in 1761, and is a -story, fieldstone and limestone structure measuring 62 feet, 6 inches, by 35 feet.  The front facade features a one-story, full width verandah.  Its design details reflect a mix of Georgian and Federal styles.  It was the site of the first post office in Chester County, established in 1796.

It was added to the National Register of Historic Places in 1979.

References

Hotel buildings completed in 1761
Hotel buildings on the National Register of Historic Places in Pennsylvania
Georgian architecture in Pennsylvania
Federal architecture in Pennsylvania
Buildings and structures in Chester County, Pennsylvania
National Register of Historic Places in Chester County, Pennsylvania
1761 establishments in Pennsylvania
Individually listed contributing properties to historic districts on the National Register in Pennsylvania